
John Franklin Godfrey (1839–1885) was a sailor, a soldier and officer in the U.S. Civil War, a city attorney of Los Angeles, California, and an attorney in private practice who, among other activities, represented people arrested for operating businesses on  Sundays.

Personal

Godfrey was born in 1839 in Bangor, Maine, the son of John Godfrey a Central Maine lawyer. Young Godfrey attended Bangor High School.

He settled in Los Angeles in 1874, purchased a house on Adams Street in the southwestern part of the city and began cultivating oranges. Godfrey married twice, his first wife dying in Los Angeles, and two years later he married again.

Godfrey was credited with saving the life of Henry Hunt, who faced a lynch mob in Los Angeles after he was put into jail and accused of murdering George W. Gillis, a popular deputy sheriff.

Col. Godfrey, seeing that the man could only be saved from lawless violence by a ruse, addressed the crowd and made a pretense of endorsing the proposed lynching. But he added that ... there was a way in which the crowd could give a better proof of its sympathy with the murdered man's family. who had been left in destitute circumstances. This was to make a contribution of money to the widow. ... But many in the crowd, though anxious to take a hand in the hanging, did not feel sympathetic enough to give anything, and began to disperse the minute the hat started on its rounds.

He died suddenly on June 29, 1885, leaving a wife and four or five children. A memorial service attracted nearly every lawyer in the city, and burial took place in the family plot.

Vocation

Sailing and sheepherding

Instead of attending college, Godfrey became a merchant sailor at about age 15 at first against the wishes of his parents, "but with their final consent that he might try the life for a year." He shipped on the Young Eagle to New Brunswick and Liverpool, England, thence on the Northland to New Orleans and Texas. In another ship he sailed as far as Buenos Ayres in South America. Having pursued sailing for two years he left ship there and became a sheepherder. Eventually, "in partnership with several other Americans—his brother among the number," he secured the leasehold of a large estate and "the proprietorship of a band of sheep."

Military

At the outbreak of the American Civil War in 1861, Godfrey returned to the United States and at age 21 he enlisted as a private in the First Maine Cavalry, but in two weeks he had secured an appointment as a first lieutenant in the First Maine Battery, Light Artillery. In August 1862, Godfrey received an order from General Butler in New Orleans detaching him from the battery and giving him permission to raise a company of cavalry in the city.  He applied for a captaincy of one of them, and received the order to raise the company (Company C, 1st Louisiana Cavalry, US).  As Captain of Company C, Godfrey, had participated in a large number of expeditions, skirmishes and battles against the Confederates in Louisiana, including the Siege of Port Hudson (May 23 - July 9, 1863), and the Battle of Clinton (June 3, 1863).  By 1864 he had been promoted bo lieutenant colonel with the Second Maine Cavalry. He resigned from the Army in summer of that year because of ill health.

After the war, Godfrey enlisted as a scout for a government expedition into Sioux country, under the command of James A. Sawyers. It was written that Godfrey, pursued by Indians and in search of help for besieged companions, once "walked 150 miles in three days and three nights, never halting for a moment's rest or sleep" and subsisting "on a chunk of raw bacon."

Civilian

In 1866 Godfrey left Montana, worked in laboring jobs in Austin, Nevada; Marysville, California, and San Francisco, then went back to Maine to read law in his father's office in Bangor and become a lawyer.

One of his clients was the Total Wreck Mining Company, which was seeking a patent. He traveled to Washington, D.C., in a successful urging of this claim, and returned with J.M. Requa of New York, the company president.

In December 1876 Godfrey was elected Los Angeles city attorney on the People's ticket, and in 1878 he was reelected on the Workingman's ticket. In 1880 he received a nomination for Congress as a candidate of the Greenback-Labor Party but lost the election. In 1882 he was selected as a delegate to the state convention of the Greenbackers in San Francisco.

Godfrey and Stephen M. White represented a group of defendants who in 1882 were prosecuted for having violated the Sunday closing laws that had been in effect in Los Angeles for the preceding nineteen years. Answering a prosecution against saloonkeeper Jacob Phillipi, who had "knowingly and willfully"  kept his business open on Sunday, Godfrey argued that the law was being enforced only against "one class" of business, that of saloons, and he compared the prosecution to that of the burning of witches in Salem, Massachusetts. The jury was unable to return a verdict, seven for conviction and five for acquittal, and it was dismissed.

References and notes

External links
 John Franklin Godfrey archive at The Historic New Orleans Collection

People from Bangor, Maine
People from West Adams, Los Angeles
1839 births
1885 deaths
American lawyers admitted to the practice of law by reading law
Los Angeles City Attorneys
19th-century American lawyers